Khowrah-e Sofla (also Romanized as Khowrah-e Soflá; also known as Khāūra, Khooreh Olya, Khooreh Sofla, and Khowrah) is a village in Dehshir Rural District, in the Central District of Taft County, Yazd Province, Iran. At the 2006 census, its population was 46, in 17 families.

References 

Populated places in Taft County